The Pixel 3 and Pixel 3 XL are a pair of Android smartphones designed, developed, and marketed by Google as part of the Google Pixel product line. They collectively serve as the successors to the Pixel 2 and Pixel 2 XL. They were officially announced on October 9, 2018 at the Made by Google event and released in the United States on October 18. On October 15, 2019, they were succeeded by the Pixel 4 and Pixel 4 XL.

Following diminished sales of the Pixel 3 lineup, on May 7, 2019 Google announced midrange variants at I/O 2019, the Pixel 3a and Pixel 3a XL.

Specifications

Design 
The Pixel 3 and Pixel 3 XL come in three colors: 'Just Black' (all black), 'Clearly White' (white with a mint green power button), and 'Not Pink' (pink, with an orange power button). The Pixel 3's bezels are significantly smaller than its predecessor's. The Pixel 3 XL is the first Pixel device to use a display notch. They both run on Android Pie natively and both have access to Android 12. The display notch can be "blacked out" in developer options.

Hardware 
The Pixel 3 and Pixel 3 XL come with a Snapdragon 845, Pixel Visual Core (PVC) and 4GB of RAM; and 64 or 128 GB of internal storage.  Both phones feature glass backs and wireless charging, which are firsts for the Pixel range. Google Pixel Stand can wirelessly charge at 10W, but wireless charging is capped to 5W when 3rd-party wireless chargers are used. They also feature front-facing stereo speakers and no headphone jack, like the Pixel 2 and Pixel 2 XL. Both phones also use a USB-C connection for charging and connecting other accessories. Both phones also contain Active Edge, where squeezing the sides of the phone activates Google Assistant, which debuted with the Pixel 2 and Pixel 2 XL.

The phones have a water protection rating of IP68 under IEC standard 60529, an improvement from its predecessors water protection rating of IP67. The phones can be submerged in up to 1.5 m of water for up to 30 minutes.

Camera 
The Pixel 3 and Pixel 3 XL have a 12.2megapixel rear camera, similar to their predecessors, the Pixel 2 and Pixel 2 XL, but Google Camera has been updated with new photography features, as well as a second wide-angle selfie camera. Some of these features include:

Night Sight - dramatically improves low light performance with no flash or tripod. Google also updated all past Pixel phones with Night Sight Support.
Astrophotography - Google updated the Pixel 3 with an improved Night Sight featuring an astrophotography mode
Super Res Zoom - employs Super-resolution techniques to increase the resolution beyond what the sensor and lens combination would traditionally achieve using subtle shifts from handheld shake and optical image stabilization (OIS).
Top Shot - takes a burst of HDR+ photos and automatically picks the best shots. An update added Top Shot for short videos.
 Group Selfie Cam - second front camera which allows for a wide angle shot
 Google Lens - recognizes objects and things seen on the Pixel 3's and Pixel 3 XL's camera
 Computational Raw - outputs DNG+JPG aligning and merging [up to 15] multiple frames to improve dynamic range and reduce noise
 Learning-based Portrait Mode - Portrait Mode now uses a machine-learning-based pipeline for more uniformly defocused backgrounds and fewer depth map errors
 Synthetic Fill Flash - uses machine-learning based segmentation algorithm to add Fill Flash to better light up faces.
 Spectral + flicker sensor - prevents flicker effect under certain indoor lighting such as LED lighting

The Pixel 3 and Pixel 3 XL use a separate chip called the Pixel Visual Core (PVC) to achieve their artificial intelligence camera capabilities. Videos are newly recorded with stereo audio.

Software 
Pixel 3 and Pixel 3 XL ship with Android 9.0 Pie at launch. Both phones will get three years of software updates and security updates guaranteed by Google. The Google Developers site has flashable factory and OTA (over-the-air) update images up to Android 12.

The Pixel 3 and Pixel 3 XL will be updated bringing several features from the Pixel 4 including: Live captions, Google Recorder, New Google Assistant, Astrophotography mode and Top Shot for short videos.

The Pixel 3 lacks the voice-unlock feature available on previous Pixel devices.

Cellular networks

Reception 
Several reviewers, including Dieter Bohn from The Verge, Mark Spoonauer from Tom's Hardware, and Julian Chokkattu from Digital Trends, stated that the Pixel 3's camera was "the best camera you could get on a smartphone." Digital Trends concluded the Pixel 3 XL had the best output, qualitatively, after comparing its camera output with other leading smartphones, including the Apple iPhone XS Max, Samsung Galaxy Note 9, and the Google Pixel 2 XL. American technology reviewer Marques Brownlee in his Smartphone Awards video in December, 2018 said that the Pixel 3 & 3 XL have the best cameras of all smartphones.

Andrei Frumusanu from AnandTech, stated "Google’s Pixels significantly climb up the ladder in terms of low-light photography ranking, even putting themselves at a comfortable distance ahead of the previous low-light champions, Huawei’s 40MP sensor phones as well as their own night mode."

The Pixel 3 XL was heavily criticized for its notch implementation.

Matt Swider from TechRadar gave both the Pixel 3 & 3 XL 4.5 out of 5 stars, praising the camera and the improved quality of the OLED screen (compared to the Pixel 2 XL's screen, which had many quality control issues), but he criticized the poor battery life of the Pixel 3 and the notch on the Pixel 3 XL, as well as the low amount of RAM, no expandable storage options, and higher pricing compared to the Pixel 2 & 2 XL. Andrew Martonik from Android Central also gave the phones 4.5 out of 5 stars, having similar complaints as Swider.

Issues 
Problems that have been reported by some users include:
 The phone can be unlocked without entering the PIN code if the intruder is able to swap in a different SIM card. This problem is exacerbated by the fact that Google terminates security patch support for its devices as soon as they have been on the market just three years; this vulnerability will affect all Pixel 3 and Pixel 4 devices unless/until the owner shifts to an alternate operating system such as GrapheneOS.
 After upgrading to Android 12, Pixel 3 devices may repeatedly dial emergency services before entering a boot loop; devices may reboot even during the call. A new gesture was added in Android 12 that causes devices to automatically dial emergency services after the power button is pressed five times — and while some users report that a stuck power button was the cause of this issue, other users report that emergency services continue to be dialed even after the gesture and Personal Safety app are disabled. Google has acknowledged the issue.
 Pixel 3 XL has imbalanced speakers. This is less pronounced on the smaller Pixel 3 due to its larger top speaker. Google said this was an intentional decision as they have used new amplifier technology with advanced speaker protection algorithms. The phone also produces an abnormal amount of vibration when using the speaker.
 Some Pixel 3 XL users have reported random notches displaying on the side of their screen.
 Some devices are overheating while charging and eventually shut down.
 The Pixel 3 loses some of the received messages. Google said that a fix will be delivered in a future update.
 Google sent some Verizon locked Pixel 3 devices to customers that ordered the unlocked model.
 Many users are reporting call quality and connection issues.
 The camera is slow both in launching the application and taking photos.
 Bluetooth audio has decreased volume compared to other devices.
 The speakerphone doesn't work at the start of a call.
 Fast wireless charging doesn't always work properly.
 Some devices have problems with autofocus. It is believed that the problem was introduced in the March security update.
 Some Pixel 3 devices are bricking themselves with an EDL message

Fixed issues 

 Some users are reporting that some camera photos are failing to save. The issue may be related to Google Camera. Google has released a fix for this in the December 2018 update.
 Background music players will get killed if switching between apps. A small number of apps can stay in the background at any time. This may be related to how memory management is handled on the phones. This was also reportedly fixed with December 2018 patch.
 Placing the phone on the Google Pixel Stand breaks ambient notifications. Google has also already patched this.
 The camera crashed with a fatal error when used from 3rd party apps. This issue is reportedly fixed with the December 2018 software update.
 Audio recording was muffled. Google said this was by design, the microphone is specifically tuned to reduce background noise, while optimizing the spoken word. Audio recording quality issues have been fixed in the January 2019 system update.
 Some devices suffered from flickering display issues connected to Ambient Display. Google was able to fix this issue in the April 2019 security patch.

Arbitration 
When the Pixel 3 was released in 2018, its warranty automatically opted-in USA and Canadian based users to a Google Arbitration Agreement. Any disputes would be handled individually in small claims court, or via arbitration through the American Arbitration Association, or through government agencies, and not as class actions. The only exception was that intellectual property issues would be handled in court. It was possible to opt-out of this arbitration agreement within 30 days of activating the device for the first time. By 2020 Google's hardware warranty no longer covered arbitration, court, or class actions.

References

External links 

 

Android (operating system) devices
Discontinued flagship smartphones
Foxconn
Google hardware
Google Pixel
Mobile phones introduced in 2018
Mobile phones with 4K video recording